In computer science, the Aharonov–Jones–Landau algorithm is an efficient quantum algorithm for obtaining an additive approximation of the Jones polynomial of a given link at an arbitrary root of unity. Finding a multiplicative approximation is a #P-hard problem, so a better approximation is considered unlikely. However, it is known that computing an additive approximation of the Jones polynomial is a BQP-complete problem.

The algorithm was published in 2009 in a paper written by Dorit Aharonov, Vaughan Jones and Zeph Landau.

The Markov trace 

The first idea behind the algorithm is to find a more tractable description for the operation of evaluating the Jones polynomial. This is done by means of the Markov trace.

It also has the additional property that if  is a Kauffman diagram whose rightmost strand goes straight up then .

Representing  in  

For a complex number  we define the map  via . It follows by direct calculation that if  satisfies that  then  is a representation.

Given a braind  let  be the link attained by identifying the bottom of the diagram with its top like in the definition of a Markov trace, and let  be the result link's Jones polynomial. The following relation holds:

where  is the writhe. As the writhe can be easily calculated classically, this reduces the problem of approximating the Jones polynomial to that of approximating the Markov trace.

The path model representation of  

We wish to construct a complex representation  of  such that the representation  of  will be unitary. We also wish that our representation will have a straightforward encoding into qubits.

Let 

and let  be the vector space which has  as an orthonormal basis.

We choose define a linear map  by defining it on the base of generators . To do so we need to define the matrix element  for any .

where . Finally set .

This representation, known as the path model representation, induces a unitary representation of the braid group.

A quantum version of the path model representation 

In order to be able to act on elements of the path model representation by means of quantum circuits, we need to encode the elements of  into qubits in a way which allows us to easily describe the images of the generators .

We represent each path as a sequence of moves, where  indicates a move to the right and  indicates a move to the left. For example, the path  will be represented by the state .

This encodes  as a subspace of the state space on  qubits.

We define the operators  within this subspace we define

We arbitrarily extend  to be the identity on the rest of the space.

We note that mapping  retains all the properties of the path model representation.

A quantum version of the Markov trace 

The benefit of this construction is that it gives us a way to represent the Markov trace in a way which can be easily approximated.

Let  be the subspace of paths we described in the previous clause, and let  be the subspace spanned by basis elements which represent walks which end on the -th position.

Note that each of the operators  fix  setwise, and so this holds for any , hence the operator  is well defined.

We define the following operator:

where  is the usual matrix trace.

It turns out that this operator is a trace operator with the Markov property, so by the theorem stated above it has to be the Markov trace. This finishes the required reductions as it establishes that to approximate the Jones polynomial it suffices to approximate .

The algorithm 

 algorithm Approximate-Jones-Trace-Closure is
     input  with  crossings
                 An integer 
     output a number  such that  
                  with all but exponentially small probability
         1. Pick a random  such that the probability
            to choose a particular  is proportional to 
         2. Randomly pick  which ends in position 
         3. Using the Hadamard test create a random variable  with
            
     Do the same to create  with 
     let  be the average of 
     return 

Notes

References

 D. Aharonov, V. Jones, Z. Landau - A Polynomial Quantum Algorithm for Approximating the Jones Polynomial

Quantum algorithms